Rafał Siadaczka (born 21 February 1972) is a retired Polish football defender. 

The highlight of his career was playing in the Champions League with Widzew Łódź in 1996.

He retired due to struggles with diabetes; he distanced himself from football entirely not even watching any matches. He entered the construction industry running a building supplies shop near Radom with a business partner.

References

1972 births
Living people
Polish footballers
Broń Radom players
Legia Warsaw players
Radomiak Radom players
Wisła Płock players
Widzew Łódź players
FK Austria Wien players
Association football defenders
Polish expatriate footballers
Expatriate footballers in Austria
Polish expatriate sportspeople in Austria
Poland international footballers